Lin-ay sang Negros 2011, the 17th edition of the annual Lin-ay sang Negros pageant was held on April 9, 2011 at the Pana-ad Stadium. A total of 24 candidates from all over Negros Occidental joined the pageant. Lin-ay sang Negros 2010 Kareen Ty of Silay City, along with Senator Jinggoy Estrada and First Lady of Negros Occidental Dr. Marilyn Marañon, crowned her successor, Ann Marie Malayo, at the end of the event.

Final results

Special awards

Other pageant notes

Significant Notes

Hinoba-an won its second title. The first was in 1998 by Jerene Vinco.
Cadiz made its first Top 3 placement since the pageant's inception in 1994.

Panel of judges 

 Mikael Daez - model
 Barbara Salvador - beauty queen
 Dr. Mae Panes - doctor
 Leo Nilo Agustin - tourism officer
 Ben Jimena - tourism officer

Hosts 

 Binibining Pilipinas - World 2006 Ann Mariz Igpit 
 John Arceo

References 

2011 beauty pageants
Beauty pageants in the Philippines
Culture of Negros Occidental
2011 in the Philippines